Domenico dall'Oglio (c. 1700 – 1764) was an Italian violinist and composer.

Biography
Domenico dall'Oglio was born in Padua, Italy. He was probably a pupil of Giuseppe Tartini, either after 1721 when Tartini was appointed Maestro di Cappella at the Basilica di Sant'Antonio in Padua, or perhaps after 1726 when Tartini founded his violin school.

In 1732 dall'Oglio was appointed violinist at the Basilica di Sant'Antonio, but in 1735 he left Padua to go to Russia with his brother Giuseppe, a cellist. Both brothers remained in St Petersburg for nearly 29 years in the service of the imperial court. Court records make frequent reference to Domenico's activities as a virtuoso violinist and composer, and as a participant in the intrigues of the court. For relaxation he liked to build musical instruments – violins and lutes. He died in Narva, Estonia, on his return journey to Italy.

Musical style
Most of dall'Oglio's works are instrumental compositions, but at the imperial court of St Petersburg, in the absence of the maestro di cappella Francesco Araja, dall'Oglio was several times called on to produce music for the theatre. He was a master of the Italian virtuoso style of the eighteenth century, with frequent use of double-stopping and passages at high positions. Structurally his violin sonatas follow the shape Allegro-Adagio-Allegro, instead of the then customary structure Allegro-Grave/Largo-Allegro; noteworthy are the slow movements of his compositions, which have elaborate embellishments typical of the school of Tartini.

Compositions
12 sonatas for violin and cello or harpsichord (1738 Amsterdam)
6 sinfonias for two violins, viola and bass, Op.1 (1753, Paris)
2 sonatas for flute and bass
12 sonatas for violin and basso continuo
4 sonatas for two violins, viola and bass
Sinfonia Russa for four violins (lost)
Various sinfonias in Russian style (lost)
Sinfonia for two clarinets, two violins, timpani and bass (lost)
Pieces for violetta and bass
17 violin concertos (with two violins, viola and cello obbligati)
10 sonatas for violin and bass
La Russia afflitta (The afflicted Russia), prologue and pieces for Tito Vespasiano (La clemenza di Tito) by Johann Adolf Hasse (lost)
E soffrirò che si – Combattuto da più venti (And who will suffer - Battered by several winds), recitative and aria for soprano and strings, for Didone abbandonata by Francesco Zoppis
Various ballets and music for the theatre

References
R.-A. Mooser, Violinistes-compositeurs italiens en Russie au XVIIIe siècle, Italian Music Magazine, vol. XLVIII, p. 219-29 (1946)
V. Duckles and M. Elmer, Thematic Catalog of a Manuscript Collection of Eighteenth-Century Italian Instrumental Music in the University of California, pp. 163–78 (Berkeley, 1963)

Notes

1700 births
1764 deaths
Year of birth uncertain
18th-century Italian musicians
Musicians from Padua
Italian classical violinists
Male classical violinists
18th-century Italian composers
Italian male composers
18th-century composers
18th-century Italian male musicians
Pupils of Giuseppe Tartini